The Cooper Brothers are a Canadian southern rock band founded in Ottawa, Ontario by brothers Brian Cooper, Dick Cooper and their long-time friend Terry King. Starting in 1974, the band released several singles under the production guidance of Les Emmerson (of the Canadian rock group Five Man Electrical Band). The group had some early regional success with the tracks “Finally (With You)” and “Miss Lonelyhearts” under the Polydor label. They had a breakthrough after collaborating with producer Gary Cape, charting in the United States.

Biography
The band first gained attention in the summer of 1978 when they signed with Capricorn Records and producer Gary Cape. The label was producing several of the most popular southern-rock acts of the time including: The Allman Brothers Band, The Marshall Tucker Band, Wet Willie, and Elvin Bishop. Over the next few years the Cooper Brothers released two albums, the self-titled, The Cooper Brothers and Pitfalls of the Ballroom. Both albums sold well and the singles "The Dream Never Dies", "Show Some Emotion" and "I'll Know Her When I See Her", all charted on the Billboard Hot 100. In 2006, the band was signed to record label EMI Records.

Among their many critical accolades, the Cooper Brothers were voted Best New Group in 1978, Best MOR Group in 1979 and Best Overall Group in 1980 by Canadian Contemporary Music Programmers. In 1980, "The Dream Never Dies" also earned an ASCAP Award as one of the most performed songs on U.S radio. The song has subsequently been recorded by several other artists including Bill Anderson and Juice Newton, and was also the title theme for a feature-length documentary on the Canadian National Ski Team.

At the height of their career the band toured extensively throughout North America, opening for The Doobie Brothers, Black Oak Arkansas, Joe Cocker, Charlie Daniels, Atlanta Rhythm Section, McGuinn, Clark & Hillman and Seals and Crofts. In addition, the band worked with some of the most prolific musicians of the day including Chuck Leavell, who played on the Cooper Brothers’ track "Ridin High".

Despite their success, the band faced a dramatic transformation in late 1980, when Capricorn Records folded. However, the band would once again go into the studio with Cape, but now joined by Les Emmerson of Five Man Electrical Band. One more album was produced, Learning to Live with It, but it had little success. With Les Emmerson now lending his experience and expertise, the Cooper Brothers produced one last album, Reach for the Sky. This last album went unreleased, and the band members parted ways shortly after, in 1983. Dick Cooper moved from music to a career as a screenwriter for children's TV programs like You Can't Do That on Television and created his own teen drama series, Highschool Confidential, while working at Ottawa television station CJOH.

In October 2006, the Cooper Brothers reunited to release a CD collection of their most popular tracks entitled, The Best of the Cooper Brothers under the Pacemaker label and the band performed for the first time on stage in over twenty years. The performance led to a number of sold-out live dates throughout Southern Ontario, including an Ottawa Bluesfest concert with the band opening up for James Taylor in front of a crowd of over 25,000 people. The experience sparked Richard Cooper's muse again and he began writing songs. Before long, the brothers had enough material for a new album and approached respected musician/producer and old friend Colin Linden. "When I heard the songs, I thought they sounded timeless. They were brimming with ideas. They weren't trivial and they were musically and lyrically so well thought out..." said Linden.

In September 2009 with Colin at the helm, the brothers went to Masterlink Studio in Nashville to begin recording with session musicians including Audley Freed (Black Crowes, Jakob Dylan, Dixie Chicks) Dan Dugmore (Linda Rostadt, James Taylor) Kevin McKendree (Brian Seltzer, Lee Roy Parnell) Lynn Williams (John Hiatt, Delbert McClinton) and Steve Mackey (Trisha Yearwood)
"Nashville was so much fun," said Richard Cooper after the fall 2009 recording sessions. "Playing alongside musicians of that calibre was inspiring and Colin certainly managed to capture the vision I had for these songs... and then some."
After additional recording back in Ottawa and Toronto, the CD was mixed in Los Angeles by John Whynot.

In February 2010, a new Cooper Brothers album, In From the Cold, was released, featuring 12 new songs. The album also featured a number of guest artists including Blue Rodeo's Jim Cuddy, plus Delbert McClinton and Chuck Leavell.

In June 2013, the Cooper Brothers released Southbound. The album was recorded at the Tragically Hip's studio in Bath, Ontario and was produced by Colin Cripps (Blue Rodeo, Crash Vegas).

The current live band line-up of Ed Bimm, Rob Holtz, Jeff Rogers, Darwin Demers, and John Steel all play and sing on every track. Other session musicians include Gary Craig (Anne Murray/Tom Cochrane/Jann Arden), Peter Fredette (Kim Mitchell), Topher Stott (Jarvis Church/ Jerome Godboo) and guitar whiz Carey Blackwell. The CD featured eleven new Richard Cooper penned tracks including the first single, "Southbound", a tongue-in-cheek look at the band's love/hate relationship with Canadian winters. Other notable songs on the CD are "Love's Been a Stranger", a duet featuring Brian and Juno Award winner, Kellylee Evans as well as "Maybe This is the Night" and "Bridges" - both songs featuring the harmonies that the band is noted for.

Radio Silence, the Cooper Brothers’ seventh studio album was released in 2017.

Well known for their charitable work around the region, they received the Mayor's City Builder Award from Ottawa Mayor Jim Watson. This work included being founding members of Ringside for Youth, which raised $3.5M from 1993 to 2019. 

Bell (born 3 September 1954) died in his sleep on 16 February 2019, at age 64. His death was announced on the band's facebook page.

Album Discography

The Cooper Brothers - 1978 - Capricorn Records

Track listing 
All selections written by Richard Cooper.
Produced by Gary Cape.
Side One
 "Rock And Roll Cowboys" - 4:30
 "The Dream Never Dies" - 4:11
 "Melody's In My Mind" - 4:50
 "Old Angel Midnight" - 4:49
Side Two
 "Life Names The Tune - We Dance" - 6:34
 "Away From You" - 6:27
 "Portrait" - 3:59
 "Crazy Sundays" - 3:57

Personnel 
The Cooper Brothers 
 Richard Cooper - electric and acoustic guitars, lead vocals (8)
 Terry King - steel guitar, lead vocals (4), vocal arrangements
 Al Serwa - keyboards, backing vocals
 Brian Cooper - bass, lead vocals (3, 5, 7), vocal arrangements
 Glenn Bell - drums, backing vocals, percussion
 Darryl Alguire - percussion, harmony vocals
Additional Personnel
 Topher Stott - Percussion
 John Saunders - banjo
 Lenny Solomon - fiddle
 Charles Robertson - flute
 Al Briscoe - dobro
 Keith Jollimore - saxophone
 Gloves McGuinty - piano (8)

Pitfalls of the Ballroom - 1979 - Capricorn Records

Track listing 
All selections written by Richard Cooper.
Produced by Gary Cape.
Side One
 "Make The Last One A Fast One" - 3:30
 "I'll Know Her When I See Her" - 3:44
 "Show Some Emotion" - 3:51
 "Ridin' Hight" - 4:47
Side Two
 "Is It The Dancer Or The Dance" - 5:07
 "Sweet Forgiver" - 4:17
 "Mustard The Dog" - 3:45
 "Heroes" - 4:46

Personnel 
The Cooper Brothers
 Richard Cooper - electric and acoustic guitars, lead vocals (8)
 Terry King - steel guitar, lead vocals 
 Al Serwa - keyboards, backing vocals
 Brian Cooper - bass, lead vocals, vocal arrangements
 Glenn Bell - drums, backing vocals, percussion
 Darryl Alguire - guitar, percussion, harmony vocals
 Charles Robertson III - flute, harmony vocals

Learning To Live With It - 1982 - Salt Records

Track listing 
All selections written by Richard Cooper.
Produced by Gary Cape.
Side One
 "	If My Heart Only Knew" - 4:28
 "Come Back Baby" - 3:02
 "You Live Just A Little" - 3:56
 "Poor Little Rich Girl"- 3:24
 "Dangerous Moon" - 3:31
Side Two
 "What's In Your Heart That Matters" - 3:18
 "Trouble Written All Over You" - 3:41
 "	Learning To Live With It" - 4:39
 "Rules Of The Road" - 3:06

Best Of the Cooper Brothers - 2006 - Pacemaker Entertainment

Track listing 
 Rock & Roll Cowboys
 The Dream Never Dies
 Know Her When I See Her
 Show Some Emotion
 Dangerous Moon
 Life Names the Time
 Icy Blue Eyes
 Old Angel Midnight
 Ridin High
 No Love Lost
 Voices (In the Night)
 If My Heart Only Knew
 Hard Ticket
 Away from You

In From The Cold - 2010

Track listing 
Gunshy
'62 Fairlane
Jukebox (Featuring Delbert McClinton)
Hard Luck Girl (Featuring Jim Cuddy)
That’s What Makes Us Great
Never Cease To Amaze
Paradise Pie
Our Love Deserves Better
Love Of The Ages
Tear Down The Walls
The Way She Shines
Little Blue Church

Southbound - 2013

Track listing 
Southbound
The Last Time I Saw Georgia
Waiting for the Hammer to Fall
Love’s Been a Stranger
Bordertown
Bridges
Maybe This is the Night
Five Point Five
Club Shangri-La
Havana Nights
What I Leave Behind

Radio Silence - 2017

Track listing 
Radio Silence
Smuggler’s Moon
Straight Outta Nowhere
(There’s Gonna Be) Rain
I’m Not Afraid
End Of The Day
Mister One Percent
Government Town
Gone Are The Days
You Don’t Have To Worry
Follow Your Heart
Getting Away With It

45 Discography

The Cooper Brothers gallery

References

External links

 The Cooper Brothers Official Website
 The Cooper Brothers CanadianBands.com entry
 Youtube Cooper Brothers Official Youtube Channel
 Discogs Discogs - Learning To Live With It
 40th Anniversary Cooper Brothers 40th Anniversary

Musical groups established in 1974
Musical groups from Ottawa
Canadian country rock groups
Capricorn Records artists
1974 establishments in Ontario